Some Days Are Diamonds is the 15th studio album by American singer-songwriter John Denver released in June 1981. The singles released from this album are "Some Days Are Diamonds (Some Days Are Stone)"/"Country Love" and "The Cowboy and the Lady".

Track listing

Side one

 "Some Days Are Diamonds (Some Days Are Stone)" (Dick Feller)
 "Gravel on the Ground" (Debbie Hupp, Bob Morrison)
 "San Francisco Mabel Joy" (Mickey Newbury)
 "Sleepin' Alone" (John Denver)
 "Easy, on Easy Street" (Johnny Slate, Larry Keith)

Side two

 "The Cowboy and the Lady" (Bobby Goldsboro)
 "Country Love" (John Denver)
 "Till You Opened My Eyes" (Alan Rush, Randy Cullers, Dennis Linde)
 "Wild Flowers in a Mason Jar (The Farm)" (Dennis Linde)
 "Boy from the Country" (Michael Martin Murphey, Owen Castleman)

Personnel
John Denver – vocals, acoustic guitar
Bill Sanford – electric guitar, mandolin
Jerry Shook, Jimmy Capps, Ray Edenton – acoustic guitar
Bob Moore, Leon Rhodes – bass
Chuck Cochrane, Hargus "Pig" Robbins, Larry Butler – keyboards
Eddie Bayers, Gene Chrisman, Jerry Carrigan – drums, percussion
Bobby Taylor – oboe
Bergen White, Buzz Cason, Diane Tidwell, Sherilyn Huffman – backing vocals
The Shelly Kurland Strings; arranged by Bill Justis
Technical
Billy Sherrill, Charlie Tallent – engineer
Barney Wyckoff, Nancy Michon – production assistance
Harry Langdon – photography

Chart performance

References

John Denver albums
1981 albums
RCA Records albums
Albums arranged by Bill Justis
Albums produced by Larry Butler (producer)